George Aloysius Leitner  (September 14, 1865 – May 18, 1937), was an American professional baseball player who played pitcher in the Major Leagues for the 1887 Indianapolis Hoosiers of the National League. He played college baseball at Fordham University and New York University. The year before leaving for the major league, in 1886 he was pitcher at the Nyack Baseball, in Rockland County, New York.

On March 1888, he graduated in medicine from Bellevue Hospital Medical College, leaving his baseball career.

References

External links

1865 births
1937 deaths
Major League Baseball pitchers
Indianapolis Hoosiers (NL) players
Fordham Rams baseball players
NYU Violets baseball players
Baseball players from New York (state)
19th-century baseball players
People from Piermont, New York
Nyack Rocklands players